Kontrashibuna Lake is a large lake in southwestern Alaska. It is located 30 miles northwest of Mount Iliamna and 30 miles northeast of Nondalton. Kontrashibuna Lake is a part of the Lake Clark National Park.

References

Lakes of Lake and Peninsula Borough, Alaska
Lakes of Alaska